Robert Lloyd Yost (1922 Kirkland, Washington – May 29, 1990 Berkeley, California) was an American career Foreign Service officer who was the United States Ambassador to Burundi from 1972 to 1974 and to the Dominican Republic from 1978 until 1982, when he retired.,

During Yost's tenure in Burundi, the Ikiza was happening.  This was a major concern for President Richard Nixon and after many attempts to bring about a resolution, Yost was recalled by Nixon “as a first step in an informal break of diplomatic relations with Burundi’s “butchers”“ as Nixon referred to them.

Yost was an Army veteran of World War II. He graduated from the University of California, Los Angeles in 1942 and received a master's degree in international relations from George Washington University. He was a graduate of the National War College.

A resident of Oakland, California, Yost died of liver failure at Alta Bates Hospital in Berkeley, California.

References

1922 births
1990 deaths
People from Kirkland, Washington
Ambassadors of the United States to Burundi
Ambassadors of the United States to the Dominican Republic
20th-century American diplomats
United States Army personnel of World War II
University of California, Los Angeles alumni
Elliott School of International Affairs alumni
National War College alumni
Deaths from liver failure
People from Oakland, California